Temenuga Island is a rocky island lying 660 m northeast of Quinton Point, Goten Peninsula on the northwest coast of Anvers Island in the Palmer Archipelago, Antarctica. Temenuga is 620 m long by 450 m wide, and is separated from Kalotina Island to the west by a 140 m wide passage.

The island is named after the settlements of Temenuga in Northern and Southern Bulgaria.

Location
British mapping in 1980.

Maps
 British Antarctic Territory.  Scale 1:200000 topographic map.  DOS 610 Series, Sheet W 64 62.  Directorate of Overseas Surveys, UK, 1980.
 Antarctic Digital Database (ADD). Scale 1:250000 topographic map of Antarctica. Scientific Committee on Antarctic Research (SCAR). Since 1993, regularly upgraded and updated.

References
 Bulgarian Antarctic Gazetteer. Antarctic Place-names Commission. (details in Bulgarian, basic data in English)
 Temenuga Island. SCAR Composite Antarctic Gazetteer.

External links
 Temenuga Island. Copernix satellite image

Islands of the Palmer Archipelago
Bulgaria and the Antarctic